Platov International Airport  is an airport close to the stanitsa of Grushevskaya, Aksaysky District, Rostov Oblast, Russia near the city of Novocherkassk northeast of Rostov-on-Don. It serves Rostov-on-Don (as a replacement for the old Rostov-on-Don Airport) and started operation in December 2017. It is named after Matvei Platov.

It was originally planned that the airport would open in November 2017, with passenger navigation starting on 1 December 2017. The project has a capacity of 5 million passengers per year. Azimuth will be the main company serving the airport. The airport was opened on 27 November 2017, with the new highway to the airport and final tests before the operations would commence. The airport commenced passenger service on 7 December 2017, and the old airport was scheduled to officially cease all its operations on 1 March 2018. In 2018, for the first year of operation of the airport, 3,236,000 passengers passed through this airport. The airport has been closed since the beginning of the 2022 Russian invasion of Ukraine.

History

Name choice
Initially, the project name was "Yuzhny" (eng. Southern). During the voting procedure for the new airport's name, "Platov" was the top choice with 40% of overall votes, whereas "Yuzhny" and "Rostov-on-Don International" had 27% and 34% respectively. Therefore, on 20 January 2017, Government of Russian Federation officially named the airport "Platov International Airport", in honor of Matvei Platov, a Russian general commanding the Don Cossacks.

Certification and opening
At the end of September, the airport construction was finished. Then, 16 October, Rosaviation had approved the new airport and the airport plans to commence the testing procedure till 20 November. After all the stages are done, the airport plans to fully open 1 December. The old airport will close, due to development issues, caused by the location inside town. More likely, the building will be demolished. On 18 November, the first aircraft Airbus A319 of Rossiya Airlines and Sukhoi Superjet 100 of Azimuth landed at the airport. These were the test mode flights. On 24 November 2017, the first 150 volunteers tested the new airport's equipment. On 27 November, Platov received its IATA code ROV from the current airport, whereas old airport received a new IATA code RVI.

The airport was officially opened on 7 December 2017 at 11:00am, with the first passenger flight of Pobeda Boeing 737-800 arriving from Moscow–Vnukovo, following with other domestic and international flights. By 1 March 2018, the old airport was going to be officially closed. At the time of construction, Platov airport was named the most expensive airport in Russia.

On 24 February 2022, in relation to the beginning of the 2022 Russian invasion of Ukraine, the airport, together with other airports in Southern Russia, were closed without prior notice.

Facilities

Passenger main terminal
The airport terminal is 50,000 m². There are 9 air-bridges and 9 bus gates. Moreover, the airport complex contains a cargo terminal and a VIP terminal with an area of 2,880 m². The car parking can accept a maximum of 2500 cars.

VIP terminal
The airport also will have a VIP terminal, with a total area of 2,880 m². Currently, the complex is still under construction and planned to be opened in early 2018. The terminal allows a maximum number of 65 passengers, with a lounge area.

Transport
Shuttle buses go from the center of Rostov-on-Don to the airport, the route interval is from 05:00 to 23:00 every half hour, from 23:00 to 05:00 every hour. Travel time is 1 hour.

Airlines and destinations

The following airlines operate from Platov International to the following destinations:

Statistics

Annual traffic

Transportation

Road
Currently, the airport is connected to the city center by M4 highway, which was reconstructed before the airport construction finished. From 1 December, when the flights commence officially, the new shuttle vans will go to the city center every 20 minutes, nevertheless, the Rostov government had purchased 20 vans for this route.

Railway
In perspective, the Aeroexpress is also planned for the route to city center, but only in case of annual passenger flow of 6 million. Currently, the government of Rostov, are planning to construct a railway line that, apart from Rostov-on-Don, will serve other big habitations, located nearby the airport.

See also
List of the busiest airports in Russia
List of the busiest airports in Europe
List of the busiest airports in the former USSR

References

External links

Airports in Rostov Oblast
Airports of Regions
Airports established in 2017